The Central District of Tabas County is a district (bakhsh) in Tabas County, South Khorasan Province, Iran. At the 2006 census, its population was 43,188, in 11,296 families.  The District has one city: Tabas.  The District has four rural districts (dehestan): Golshan Rural District, Montazeriyeh Rural District, Nakhlestan Rural District, and Pir Hajat Rural District.

References 

Districts of South Khorasan Province
Tabas County